SPAK, Special Anti-Corruption Structure is an independent judicial entity tasked with investigating corruption and organized crime at the highest levels of government and society in Albania. It consists of the National Bureau of Investigation, the Special Prosecution and the Special Courts.

Structure 
 The National Bureau of Investigation is a specialized unit of the Judicial Police which investigates criminal offenses that are under the jurisdiction of the Special Prosecution, in accordance with the provisions underlined by the Code of Criminal Procedure. BKH is composed of the head (director), investigators and the services provided by the Judicial Police which are under the controlled supervision of the Special Prosecution.
 The Special Prosecution office prosecutes and represents the prosecution on behalf of the State before the Special Courts. It takes measures and supervises the execution of criminal decisions and performs other duties assigned by law. The Special Prosecution office performs its functions independently through special prosecutors who are appointed by the High Prosecution Council.
 The Special Court Against Corruption and Organized Crime, which is the successor of the Serious Crimes Court, is composed of 18 judges, of which 5 are permanent and 13 are temporary. It tries all cases brought forth by the Special Prosecution.

See also 
 Judiciary of Albania

References

Judiciary of Albania
 
 
 
2019 establishments in Albania
Courts and tribunals established in 2019